FC Bihor Oradea may refer to:

 FC Bihor Oradea (1958), a dissolved football club in Oradea, Romania
 FC Bihor Oradea (2022), phoenix football club in Oradea, Romania